Holographic Data Storage System (HDSS) program was a US Federal government-funded consortium on holographic data storage by Teledyne Technologies, IBM and Stanford University, created in 1995. Work on the program began in 1994 and was funded by DARPA.

History
The holographic data storage system was created with the initial goals of developing several key components for the system, including a high-capacity, high-bandwidth spatial light modulator used for data input; optimized sensor arrays for data output; and a high-power red semiconductor Laser. At the same time, the HDSS researchers were to explore issues relating to the optical systems architecture (such as multiplexing schemes and access modes), data encoding and decoding methods, signal processing techniques, and the requirements of target applications. Into the program's final year, progress has been such that consortium member - IBM Research Division - believes that holograms could hold the key to high-capacity data storage in the next millennium.

Mechanism
Large amounts of data can be stored holographically because lasers are able to store pages of electronic patterns holographic storage -- sometimes referred to as 3D storage within special optical materials as opposed to just on the surface. In traditional holography, each viewing angle gives a different aspect of the same object. With holographic storage, however, a different 'page' of information is accessed.  
Holographic storage uses two laser beams, a reference and a data beam to create an interference pattern at a medium where the two beams intersect. This intersection causes a stable physical or chemical change which is stored in the medium. This is the write sequence. During reading, the action of the reference beam and the stored interference pattern in the medium recreates this data beam which may be sensed by a detector array. The medium may be a rotating disk containing a polymeric material, or an optically sensitive single crystal. The key to making the holographic data storage system work is the second laser beam which is fired at the crystal to retrieve a page of data. It must match the original reference beam angle exactly. A difference of just a thousandth of a millimeter will result in failure to retrieve the data. Holography is expected to be of value in archival or library storage applications where large quantities of data are required to be retained at the very lowest costs possible.

Apparent benefits
Since it involves no moving parts, holographic data storage will be more reliable than existing hard disk technologies. IBM has already demonstrated the possibility of holding 1 TB of data in a crystal the size of a sugar cube and of data access rates of one trillion bits per second. The major challenge ahead is expected to be the development of a rewritable form of holographic storage.

During CES 2006, a workable holographic drive was tested and stored 300 GB of memory compared to Blu-ray's 100 GB. It has been announced that hologram disks will be a post-Blu-ray storage device.

References 

Holographic data storage
Computer storage devices